Brighton, New York may refer to:

Brighton, Erie County, New York
Brighton, Franklin County, New York
Brighton, Monroe County, New York
Brighton, Syracuse, New York, a neighborhood in Syracuse, New York

See also
Brighton Beach, a community on Coney Island, Brooklyn, New York City
New Brighton, Staten Island, a former village, now part of New York City
 Brighton (disambiguation)